Kelvin McKenzie (born February 2, 1983, in Georgetown, Guyana) was a footballer, currently retired who played for multiple teams, however, his latest was Alpha United..

International career
McKenzie was a member of the Guyana national football team.

References

1983 births
Living people
Sportspeople from Georgetown, Guyana
Guyanese footballers
Guyanese expatriate footballers
Guyana international footballers
North East Stars F.C. players
Guyanese expatriate sportspeople in Trinidad and Tobago
Expatriate footballers in Trinidad and Tobago
TT Pro League players
Association football defenders